Farwaniya Governorate ( Muḥāfaẓat al-Farwānīyah) is the most populous of the six governorates of Kuwait, in terms of a total number of residents. It is Kuwait City's main residential area and also forms an important part of Kuwait's commercial activities. The Governor is Faisal H. M. Al-Sabah as of May 2014. Al Farwaniyah consists of the following districts:

Farwaniya Governorate

Sports
Al tadamon Basketball Team is a Kuwaiti amateur basketball club based in Al Farwaniya.
Al Tadamon Sports Club is located in Al Farwaniyah Governorate, won the Kuwaiti Division One three times.

References

Districts of Al Farwaniyah Governorate
Governorates of Kuwait